Mary Alexandra "Alex" Bruce (born May 27, 1990) is a Canadian badminton player from Toronto, Ontario. She competed at the 2012 Summer Olympics in the Women's doubles event with partner Michelle Li.

Early career
She started playing badminton at aged 8. Her parents were members of a badminton club that put on clinics for kids. She won silver in doubles at the 2008 Commonwealth Youth Games. Bruce studied Engineering and played Varsity Badminton for the University of Western Ontario, where she was named OUA Female Rookie of the Year in 2008. At the 2009 Canadian university and college national championships, she won two gold medals in doubles play, and a silver medal in women's singles. At the 2010 Yonex National Championships, she and Martin Giuffre won the U23 Mixed Doubles title. Bruce also won bronze in Ladies' Singles, and silver in Ladies' Doubles with future Olympic partner Michelle Li.

Personal life
Her parents are David and Cindy Bruce. Her older brother, Max played football at Queens University and the University of Manitoba. She graduated from Western University in 2014 with a Bachelor of Engineering Science (Civil Structural Engineering).

2012 Olympics
At the 2012 Summer Olympics, Bruce and Li finished last in the round-robin portion, losing all three of their matches. However, the top two teams in the group were disqualified for attempting to intentionally lose matches so they would have an easier match-up in the quarterfinals. The duo was advanced to their quarterfinals, where they defeated Australia's Leanne Choo and Renuga Veeran. Bruce and Li finished in fourth place, the best Canadian finish in badminton at the Olympic Games.

She competed at the 2014 Commonwealth Games, in the mixed teams, mixed doubles (with Toby Ng) and women's doubles (with Phyllis Chan).

Achievements

Pan American Games 
Women's doubles

Mixed doubles

Pan Am Championships 
Women's doubles

Mixed doubles

BWF International Challenge/Series 
Women's doubles

Mixed doubles

  BWF International Challenge tournament
  BWF International Series tournament

References

External links

 
 

1990 births
Living people
Sportspeople from Toronto
Canadian female badminton players
Olympic badminton players of Canada
Badminton players at the 2012 Summer Olympics
Badminton players at the 2015 Pan American Games
Badminton players at the 2011 Pan American Games
Pan American Games gold medalists for Canada
Pan American Games silver medalists for Canada
Pan American Games bronze medalists for Canada
Pan American Games medalists in badminton
Commonwealth Games competitors for Canada
Badminton players at the 2014 Commonwealth Games
Badminton players at the 2010 Commonwealth Games
Medalists at the 2011 Pan American Games
Medalists at the 2015 Pan American Games
20th-century Canadian women
21st-century Canadian women